Selliah Parameshwaram Kurukkal (died February 7, 2007) was the Chief Pujari of the Santhiveli Pilleyar Kovil. He became famous after blessing Mahinda Rajapakse, Prime Minister of Sri Lanka. He was murdered four days afterwards.  According to the Sri Lankan Army, he was killed by the LTTE. The LTTE contends that Kurukkal was murdered by Sri Lankan paramilitary forces.

External links
Hindu priest shot dead The Hindu - February 9, 2007
Another Hindu priest murdered by paramilitary - Peace Secretariat - LTTE
A Hindu priest, Selliah Kurukkal Parameshwaran, the Chief Poosari of the Santhiveli Pilleyar Kovil, Batticaloa is seen putting Asian Tribune - February 8, 2008

2007 deaths
Sri Lankan Tamil priests
Sri Lankan Hindus
Hindu martyrs
Hindu priests
21st-century clergy
Assassinated Sri Lankan people
Year of birth missing